Waudo-guyŏk is a kuyŏk in Namp'o Special City, South P'yŏngan province, North Korea.

Plans have been announced to create a "Chindo Export Processing Zone" from some areas of Chindo-dong and Hwado-ri, Waudo-guyŏk.

The West Sea Barrage is located in Waudo District.

Administrative divisions
Waudo-guyŏk is divided into 18 tong (neighbourhoods) and 5 ri (villages):

Transportation
Waudo District is served by the P'yŏngnam and Sŏhaekammun lines of the Korean State Railway.

References

Districts of Nampo